Yulia Anatolyevna Chepalova (born 23 December 1976 in Komsomolsk-on-Amur, Russian SFSR) is a former Russian cross-country skier.

Early and current personal life
Daughter of a cross-country skiing coach, Chepalova started to ski as soon as she began to walk. Coached by her father, Anatoly Chepalov, Yulia made her debut in 1986 and continued to move upward through the old Soviet system (and later Russian, following the collapse of the Soviet Union in late 1991). Chepalov, a coach of the Russian junior national team, reportedly sold off all of his assets to help finance his daughter's career. Chepalova is currently affiliated with Dynamo Moscow, lives in Syktyvkar with her second husband, Vasily Rochev, and her daughter Olesya, and their daughter Vaselina who was born in February 2007; works as a sports instructor, and speaks, besides her native Russian, also some German.

Skiing career
Debuting on the FIS cross-country circuit in the 1995–1996 season, Chepalova has continually ranked in the Top 15 throughout her career (the lone exception is the 2002–2003 season, where she took maternity leave to have her daughter Olesya), finishing #1 overall in 2000–2001 (#3 in 2005–2006 with #1 in the distance category (greater than 5 km)). This includes success at the FIS Nordic World Ski Championships, with golds in the 4 × 5 km relay (2001) and 7.5 km + 7.5 km double pursuit (2005), silvers in the 4 × 5 km relay and 10 km freestyle (both 2005), and bronzes in the Individual sprint (2001) and Team sprint (2005). Additionally, Chepalova has won the women's 30 km at the Holmenkollen ski festival three times (1999, 2004, and 2006), joining fellow Russian cross-country skier Larisa Lazutina as the only three-time winners of the event. She earned the Holmenkollen medal in 2004.

At the 1998 Winter Olympics, Chepalova won the women's 30 km freestyle event in her Olympic debut, becoming the youngest winner of that event (and in women's cross-country skiing). Four years later at the 2002 Winter Olympics, Chepalova won a complete set of medals with gold in the Individual sprint, silver in the 10 km classical, and bronze in the 15 km freestyle. At the Winter Olympics in Turin, Chepalova would win two more medals with a gold in the 4 × 5 km relay and a silver in the 30 km freestyle mass start.

Chepalova was absent from the cross-country skiing World Cup for the 2006–2007 season to pregnancy.

She tested positive for Erythropoietin (EPO) during an in-competition doping control on 3 January 2009 in Val di Fiemme, Italy. She was banned from competition for two years after this.

Immediately after the EPO test results went public her father and coach Anatoly Chepalov officially announced her retirement. On 29 November 2009, Chepalova addressed IOC President Jacques Rogge where she came down hard on the World Anti-Doping Agency, accusing the organisation of being biased and unscrupulous in general, of unlawful ruling of her case in particular, and of "severing the career" of many good athletes but all the efforts to restore her good name were of no avail. Following this, in December 2009, Chepalova ostracised Russian Olympic Committee President Leonid Tyagachyov and Ski Federation of Russia President Vladimir Loginov for "their inaction in matters of defending the sportsmen whose guilt is not yet proven".

Cross-country skiing results
All results are sourced from the International Ski Federation (FIS).

Olympic Games
 6 medals – (3 gold, 2 silver, 1 bronze)

a.  Larisa Lazutina and Olga Danilova tested positive in the drug test which was taken an hour before the relay race, after their names were submitted for the race. Russia couldn't replace them because according to the rules, replacement must have been done at least two hours before the starting time.

World Championships
 6 medals – (2 gold, 2 silver, 2 bronze)

a.  Cancelled due to extremely cold weather.

World Cup

Season titles
 2 titles – (1 overall, 1 distance)

Season standings

Individual podiums
 18 victories 
 33 podiums

Team podiums
 13 victories – (11 , 2 )
 25 podiums – (22 , 3 )

Overall record

a.  Classification is made according to FIS classification.
b.  Includes individual and mass start races.
c.  Includes pursuit and double pursuit races.

See also
Cross-country skiing at the 1998 Winter Olympics
Cross-country skiing at the 2002 Winter Olympics
Cross-country skiing at the 2006 Winter Olympics

References

External links

"FIS Doping Panel delivers two decisions". – FIS 23 December 2009 article accessed 25 December 2009.

 – click Holmenkollmedaljen for downloadable pdf file 
 – click Vinnere for downloadable pdf file 

1976 births
Living people
People from Komsomolsk-on-Amur
Doping cases in cross-country skiing
Russian sportspeople in doping cases
Cross-country skiers at the 1998 Winter Olympics
Cross-country skiers at the 2002 Winter Olympics
Cross-country skiers at the 2006 Winter Olympics
Olympic cross-country skiers of Russia
Holmenkollen medalists
Holmenkollen Ski Festival winners
Olympic gold medalists for Russia
Olympic silver medalists for Russia
Olympic bronze medalists for Russia
Russian female cross-country skiers
Olympic medalists in cross-country skiing
FIS Nordic World Ski Championships medalists in cross-country skiing
FIS Cross-Country World Cup champions
Medalists at the 2006 Winter Olympics
Medalists at the 2002 Winter Olympics
Medalists at the 1998 Winter Olympics
Sportspeople from Khabarovsk Krai
21st-century Russian women